TOTE Sport Radio was a statewide radio network based in Tasmania.  It was owned by TOTE Tasmania, the State Government's betting and gaming agency. The TOTE was sold to Tatts group, and as a result the radio network was integrated into Tatts groups other radio operations.

TOTE Sport Radio broadcasts are largely a relay of Sport 927 in Melbourne, although some syndicated programming is broadcast on the Launceston frequency. TOTE Sport Radio broadcasts live commentary of thoroughbred, harness and greyhound racing along with race form and betting information. Other sports are also covered in breakfast and weekend programming.

Frequencies

Hobart – 1080 AM 
Launceston – 1008 AM
Burnie – 97.7 FM
Devonport – 101.3 FM

A narrowcast relay on 87.6 FM is broadcast in the following towns: Bicheno, Queenstown, Rosebery, Strahan, St Helens, St Marys, Smithton and Zeehan.
It is famous for its sports breakfast segment.

See also	
 List of radio stations in Australia

References

External links
Tote Tasmania Group

Radio stations in Hobart
Radio stations in Tasmania
Sports radio stations in Australia